Aliyak or Aliak or Aleyak or Ali Aq may refer to:
 Aliyak, Khoshab
 Aleyak, Zaveh